Pol Roigé Rodríguez (born 28 January 1994) is a Spanish professional footballer who plays mainly a right winger, he can also play as a forward.

Club career
Born in Barcelona, Catalonia, Roigé played for RCD Espanyol and FC Barcelona's youth setup before joining Real Madrid on 26 July 2011. In the 2012 summer, however, he was released by the club and moved to Cornellà, finishing his graduation with the latter.

On 7 August 2013, Roigé was loaned to Tercera División club Castelldefels. He made his senior debut for the club, scoring two goals in 33 appearances. He moved to Sabadell on 27 June of the following year, being assigned to the reserves also in the fourth level. Roigé made his professional debut on 4 January 2015, coming on as a late substitute in a 1–0 home win against Recreativo de Huelva in the Segunda División. On 30 May he renewed his link with Sabadell, signing a two-year deal and being definitely promoted to the main squad.

On 11 January 2016 Roigé was transferred to Mallorca in the second tier, after scoring five goals during the first half of the campaign. He scored his first professional goal on 24 May, netting the winner in a 2–1 home success over Elche CF. Roigé subsequently had loan spells at Celta Vigo B and Hércules before moving abroad for the first time on 16 July 2019 with GIF Sundsvall. On 19 January 2020, Roigé joined Petrolul Ploiești in the Romanian second division.

References

External links

1994 births
Living people
Footballers from Barcelona
Spanish footballers
Association football wingers
Association football forwards
Segunda División players
Segunda División B players
Tercera División players
Superettan players
Liga II players
UE Cornellà players
CE Sabadell FC B players
CE Sabadell FC footballers
RCD Mallorca players
Celta de Vigo B players
Hércules CF players
GIF Sundsvall players
FC Petrolul Ploiești players
Spanish expatriate footballers
Expatriate footballers in Sweden
Spanish expatriate sportspeople in Sweden
Expatriate footballers in Romania
Spanish expatriate sportspeople in Romania